Lachawa  (Liakhava) is a former village in the administrative district of Gmina Tyrawa Wołoska, within Sanok County, Subcarpathian Voivodeship, in south-eastern Poland.

References

Lachawa